General Police (Ret.) Timur Pradopo (born 10 January 1955),  was Chief of the Indonesian National Police (Kapolri) from 22 October 2010 until 25 October 2013. Timur Pradopo replaced Chief of  Police General Bambang Hendarso Danuri who was relieved of duty. He was nominated by Indonesian President Susilo Bambang Yudhoyono.

Career History
Chief of West Jakarta District Metro Police
Chief of Central Jakarta District Metro Police
Operation Bureau Chief of West Java Regional Police
Chief of Bandung Metropolis Police
Development Corps Youth and Students of Directorate of Youth and Training
Regional Supervising Inspector of Bali Regional Police (2004–2005)
Chief of Banten Regional Police (2005–2008)
Advanced Principal Officers Police Education and Training Institutions (2008)
Social and Politic Expert Staff of Chief of National Police of Indonesia (2008)
Chief of West Java Regional Police (2008–2010)
Chief of Greater Jakarta Metropolitan Regional Police (2010)
Head of the Police Security Sustainer (2010)
Chief of National Police of Indonesia (2010–2013)

References

|-

|-

|-

|-

Indonesian police officers
Chiefs of police
Living people
Javanese people
1955 births
Indonesian Muslims
Recipients of the Darjah Utama Bakti Cemerlang